#447 is the eighth studio album by rock artist Marshall Crenshaw. It was released in 1999 on Razor & Tie. It was re-released in 2021 on Shinytone, in both vinyl and CD formats. There are two bonus tracks on the re-released CD.

Track listing
All songs written by Marshall Crenshaw, except where noted.
"Opening" – 0:49
"Dime a Dozen Guy" (Crenshaw, David Cantor) – 4:05
"Television Light" – 4:44
"Glad Goodbye" – 4:05
"West of Bald Knob" – 3:26
"Tell Me All About It" (Crenshaw, Richard Julian) – 3:41
"Ready Right Now" (Crenshaw, Bill Lloyd) – 4:49
"Eydie's Tune" – 3:18
"T.M.D." (Crenshaw, Bill Demaine) – 3:24
"Right There in Front of Me" – 4:06
"You Said What??" – 3:18

Personnel
Marshall Crenshaw - vocals, guitar, bass, drums, drum machines, percussion, Mellotron, celeste
Brad Jones – bass, chamberlain, electric piano, organ
David Hofstra – bass
David Sancious – electric piano
Greg Leisz – dobro, lap steel
Bill Lloyd – guitar, mandolin
Andy York – guitar
Pat Buchanan – guitar, power steel
 Chris Carmichael – viola, violin, fiddle
Valentina Evans – viola
Footch Fischetti – fiddle
Rachel Handman – violin
Paul Shapiro – tenor sax

References 

1999 albums
Marshall Crenshaw albums